Washington Land is a peninsula in northwestern Greenland. It is a part of the Avannaata municipality.

Washington Land was explored in the 19th century. Traditionally it was one of the hunting grounds of the Inuit, but there are archaeological remains of more permanent human habitation in ancient times.

Geography
Washington Land is located to the west of Daugaard-Jensen Land, between the Kane Basin in the west and northwest and Peabody Bay in the south. Crozier Island, Franklin Island and Hans Island are located off Lafayette Bay in its NW shore.

The Cass Fjord forms the peninsula's southeastern coastline, across which is the Humboldt Glacier and beyond it Inglefield Land. The Aleqatsiaq Fjord forms the limit of its northern shore. Cape Jackson is Washington Land's south-westernmost headland and protrudes at the junction of the Kennedy Channel and the Kane Basin.  The northernmost headland is Cape Bryan.

Washington Land is a largely unglaciated peninsula. Adams Bjerg is located in the middle region.

See also
Washington Land Group

Bibliography
H.P. Trettin (ed.), Geology of the Innuitian Orogen and Arctic Platform of Canada and Greenland. Geological Survey of Canada (1991) 
 Ole Bennike, Jon Feilberg: Bird observations in Washington Land, North Greenland, in 1999. Dansk Orn. Foren. Tidsskr. 98 (2004): 192–195
 Ole Bennike: Late Quaternary history of Washington Land, North Greenland. Boreas, Vol. 31 (2002), 260–272. Oslo.

References

External links 
Silurian graptolites from N Greenland - Geological Society

Peninsulas of Greenland